Anoia is a comarca (county) in central Catalonia, Spain, with its capital at Igualada.

The comarca of l'Anoia is irrigated by the Anoia River; the leading industry is the making of paper.

To the north are Solsonès and Bages, to the west, Baix Llobregat to the south Baix Penedès  and Alt Camp, and to the east Conca de Barberà and Segarra.

Municipalities

References

External links 

Official web site of the Consell Comarcal de l'Anoia (in Catalan)

 
Comarques of the Province of Barcelona